Ricardo Larios (born 10 November 1952) is a Nicaraguan sprinter. He competed in the men's 400 metres at the 1976 Summer Olympics.

References

1952 births
Living people
Athletes (track and field) at the 1976 Summer Olympics
Nicaraguan male sprinters
Olympic athletes of Nicaragua
Place of birth missing (living people)